Aval Milk or Avil Milk is a Kerala cuisine drink sold in the streets of the Malabar region of Kerala, India. Aval milk is made with aval which is essentially poha or beaten rice flakes, along with ripe bananas, milk of any kind, and nuts.

History
This preparation of Avil milk is unique to the Malappuram district in Kerala and the drink evolved firstly at Kottakkal malabar. The main ingredients for this milkshake are roasted rice flakes / Poha (rice), Chiquita banana / Mysore banana (Palayam kodan banana), roasted peanuts and nuts. It can be used as a breakfast smoothie or as a dessert.

Ingredients for Avil milk recipe
Aval: rice flakes/ Poha (rice) /beaten rice. Preferably use the thick version. There are thin and airy flakes that may dissolve too soon. 
Ghee or butter: This is optional but makes it tastier and filling. Use it to toast the aval and nuts.
Banana: any ripe banana will work. Mash it using a fork.
Milk: Use chilled. You may use laban, coconut milk, almond milk, cashew milk, etc. a pinch of cardamom powder or cinnamon powder (this is to flavor the milk)
Roasted nuts: Peanuts, Cashew, Almond, etc.
Sweetener: as per taste you can use honey, stevia, sugar etc.

Preparation

First, roast the rice flakes with or without ghee/butter. Then roasting the flakes in ghee which means making it even more full-filling for a meal. Roast the nuts if not roasted already. Mash the bananas with a fork. Chop up any other seasonal fruits if using. Make sure the milk you want to use is chilled. Assemble all in a tall glass and stir and eat or drink!

Image gallery

See also 
 Poha (rice)
 Kottakal
 Almond milk
 Milk substitute
 Banana
 Flattened rice
 Kerala cuisine
 Milkshake
 Health shake

References

External links
 Recipes

Banana drinks
 
cuisine
Vegetarian dishes of India
Indian rice dishes
Cold drinks
Shake
Milk-based drinks
Non-alcoholic drinks